Morrison ministry may mean:
First Morrison ministry (2018–2019), the 72nd ministry of the Government of Australia
Second Morrison ministry,  (2019–2022), the 73rd ministry of the Government of Australia